Sapé is a municipality in the state of Paraíba in the Northeast Region of Brazil.

The municipality contains the Fazenda Pacatuba Private Natural Heritage Reserve, which protects a population of red-handed howler monkeys.

See also
List of municipalities in Paraíba

References

Municipalities in Paraíba